K. S. R. Murthy was a member of the 11th Lok Sabha of India. He represented the Amalapuram constituency of Andhra Pradesh  and was a member of the Indian National Congress. He was in Prajarajyam party for some time and later resigned from the Party to join congress again. Prior to entering politics he served in Indian Administrative Service and rose to the level of secretary to Government of India.

Lives in Hyderabad, Andhra Pradesh. He has three children (Srikanth, Sumedha and Sanjay) with his late Wife Smt Anasuya Devi Murthy.

References

Living people
Telugu politicians
India MPs 1996–1997
Indian National Congress politicians from Andhra Pradesh
Indian Administrative Service officers
People from East Godavari district
Year of birth missing (living people)